XHBZ-FM is a radio station on 100.5 FM in Delicias, Chihuahua, Mexico. The station is owned by Sigma Radio and carries the Los 40 national format.

History
XHBZ began as XEBZ-AM 1590, located more specifically in Meoqui. It received its concession on March 2, 1962, and was owned by La Voz de Meoqui, S.A., broadcasting as a daytimer. By the 2000s, it had moved to Delicias and added nighttime service.

It migrated to FM in 2011.

References

Radio stations in Chihuahua